Trypophloeus striatulus, the willow bark beetle, is a species of typical bark beetle in the family Curculionidae.

References

Further reading

 
 

Scolytinae
Articles created by Qbugbot
Beetles described in 1853